Kikka Hanazawa (花沢 菊香 born October 26, 1970) is a social entrepreneur and cofounded a global fashion nonprofit humanitarian organization Fashion Girls for Humanity.

Early life and education 
Born in Tokyo, Kikka Hanazawa is the daughter of Ikue Hanazawa and Kiyoshi Yokoyama. Her father was a business entrepreneur-turned-Tendai Buddhist monk, and her mother Ikue Hanazawa owned an haute couture business. Her aunt was Tomiyo Hanazawa, who designed modern kimono for Chiyo Uno and staged the first kimono fashion show in the US in 1957.  Both Tomiyo and Ikue started their careers in fashion working for Uno Chiyo, a feminist author in Japan, who founded Sutairu ("Style"), Japan's first fashion magazine in 1936, along with the boutique in Ginza. Following Chiyo Uno's advice to be an independent woman, Tomiyo and Ikue Hanazawa remained unmarried and became very involved in the fashion business with Chiyo Uno for much of their lives. While Hanazawa grew up around women working in fashion, she initially had no interest in fashion as a career. 

In 2000, Hanazawa graduated magna cum laude with a B.A. in art history & architecture theory from Columbia University. To fund her education at Columbia, she worked at Itochu and quickly became one of the youngest female managers in New York.  She then received an M.B.A. from Harvard Business School in 2002.

Career 
Hanazawa was the CEO of VPL, a women's activewear brand, which was acquired by Yabbey in 2022. Prior to VPL, Hanazawa was part of the senior leadership at Theory,  leading its IPO, M&A activities, and strategic development. She also worked at Cygne Designs,  where she led a management buyout of its international business, which she started and sold.

Philanthropy 
Hanazawa served on the finance committee for the Council of Fashion Designers of America (CFDA) and the CFDA Fashion Incubator program.  She currently serves on the board of visitors of the Columbia University School of General Studies. and the Executive Director’s Advisory Council for the New York Public Library for the Performing Arts.

Awards
 2007 Finalist, Council of Fashion Designers of America (CFDA)'s Vogue Fashion Fund
 2011 Finalist, WGSN Global Fashion Award for Outstanding New Store
 2012 Winner, CFDA Lexus Eco Challenge 
 2014 Recipient, Asia Society Game Changer Awards (2014) 
 2014 Forbes Asia 48 Heroes of Philanthropy (2014) 
 2020 Finalist, Rising Star Award by Harvard Business School Women’s Association of Greater New York
 2021 Recipient, FLAIR Award from Harvard Alumni for Fashion, Luxury, and Retail
 2021 Finalist, Fast Company’s World Changing Ideas North America (2021)  (Fashion Girls for Humanity)
 2022 Finalist, Fast Company’s World Changing Ideas (2022)  (Yabbey)

References

External links
 VPL
 Fashion Girls for Humanity
 Yabbey 

1970 births
Living people
21st-century American businesspeople
21st-century American businesswomen
21st-century Japanese businesspeople
American chief executives of fashion industry companies
American fashion businesspeople
American fashion designers
American philanthropists
American women chief executives
American women fashion designers
Businesspeople from Tokyo
Columbia University School of General Studies alumni
Harvard Business School alumni
Japanese chief executives
Japanese emigrants to the United States
Japanese fashion designers
Japanese women fashion designers
Japanese philanthropists
Japanese women chief executives
Women philanthropists